The 1930 Georgia Tech Yellow Jackets football team represented the Georgia Tech Golden Tornado of the Georgia Institute of Technology during the 1930 college football season. The Tornado was coached by William Alexander in his 11th year as head coach, compiling a record of 2–6–1.

Schedule

References

Georgia Tech
Georgia Tech Yellow Jackets football seasons
{Georgia Tech Yellow Jackets football